Gracie Films  is an American film and television production company founded by James L. Brooks in 1986. The company is primarily responsible for producing its long-running flagship animated series The Simpsons, as well as the films Big, Broadcast News, and Jerry Maguire.

The Gracie Films Headquarters is located in the Fox Studios lot at 10201 West Pico Boulevard Bldg 41/42, Los Angeles CA 90064.

Overview
James L. Brooks, who had previously founded John Charles Walters Company, founded Gracie Films at 20th Century Fox in 1986, with Polly Platt as executive vice president. Named for comedian Gracie Allen, the company was established to "provide real writers with a vehicle to get their movies made". Its primary distributor is currently Sony Pictures Entertainment, though it continues to produce The Simpsons at Fox's studio in Century City, Los Angeles.

According to Simpsons Confidential, Brooks gave The Simpsons''' writing staff free rein, as he firmly believed they were the most important part of the process, and "in the legal battles over The Simpsons, it was Fox that was being sued, not Gracie Films". The company also coordinates international distribution and dubbing for The Simpsons, "[finding] voices for dubbing that would match those of the original American actors as closely as possible." Gracie Films’ main production office is at the Sidney Poitier building on the Sony Pictures Studios lot in Culver City, California. In 1989, Gracie Films had struck a deal with ABC.

Logo
Gracie Films' production logo depicts noisy patrons in a movie theater (which were the voices of then-CEO of Fox Garth Ancier and music composer Jeffrey Townsend double-tracked to sound like there were more people) being shushed by a woman in the back row (with the shush sound being done by Tracey Ullman). The company's name appears on the screen, accompanied by a brief passage played on keyboard. Audio variations exist on The Simpsons'', often with dialogue from the episode or characters such as Homer responding to the shush. The most common audio variation is on the Treehouse of Horror episodes excluding Treehouse of Horror (The Simpsons episode) which used the original logo audio and Treehouse of Horror II and Treehouse of Horror III which has the organ theme only, where the shushing sound was replaced by a woman screaming and the logo's music is played in a minor key on a synth-emulated pipe organ. Originally, the Roland D-50 PN-D50-01 Pipe Organ preset was used for that particular variant. The music was composed by Jeffrey Townsend and Alf Clausen on a tiny Korg synth rack using a custom programmed preset.

Filmography

Television

Films

Theme park

Shorts

References

 
American companies established in 1986
Film production companies of the United States
Television production companies of the United States
Mass media companies established in 1986
Companies based in Culver City, California
1986 establishments in California